United Nations Security Council resolution 930, adopted unanimously on 27 June 1994, after recalling resolutions 772 (1992) and 894 (1994), the Council noted with satisfaction that a democratic and non-racial government had been established in South Africa, and terminated the United Nations Observer Mission in South Africa (UNOMSA).

The efforts of the Special Representative of the Secretary-General Boutros Boutros-Ghali and UNOMSA, together with the Organisation of African Unity, Commonwealth of Nations and the European Union were commended. Finally, the Council decided to remove the item titled "The question of South Africa" from the matters of which it was seized. International sanctions on the country were lifted in Resolution 919.

See also
 List of United Nations Security Council Resolutions 901 to 1000 (1994–1995)
 Negotiations to end apartheid in South Africa
 South African general election, 1994
 South Africa under apartheid

References

External links
 Records of the United Nations Observer Mission in South Africa (UNOMSA) (1992–1994) at the United Nations Archives

Text of the Resolution at undocs.org

 0930
1994 in South Africa
 0930
June 1994 events